Bharatiya Gorkha Prajatantrik Morcha (BGPM) is a political party based in Darjeeling district and Kalimpong district of West Bengal in India. BGPM was founded on 9 September 2021. The president of the party is Anit Thapa, who was earlier a leader of Gorkha Janmukti Morcha.

Election history
BGPM contested the Darjeeling Municipality election in February 2022. It won 9 seats out of a total of 32 seats. BGPM contested in 36 seats in the Gorkhaland Territorial Administration election held on 26 June 2022. It won 27 seats in the election to form the GTA Sabha. BGPM has one member, Ruden Sada Lepcha, in the West Bengal Legislative Assembly, who won as a Gorkha Janmukti Morcha (Binoy-Anit) candidate from Kalimpong Assembly constituency in 2021. Two Hamro Party councillors of the GTA joined BGPM on 5 November 2022. Six Hamro Party ward commissioners of Darjeeling Municipality joined BGPM on 24 November 2022.

References

Political parties in India
Political parties established in 2021
2021 establishments in India